Mohammodu Odolaye Aremu was an Ilorin born  Dadakuada artiste who sang in many Yoruba cities and recorded many albums until his death in 1997. During his life, he lived in
many places including
Ibadan, Ilorin, Abeokuta,
Okeho, Shaki and Lagos. He
however lived more in Ibadan
than other places.

Musical career
Dadakuada is a form of folk music that bemuses and
entertains at the same time. Like most of Yoruba musicians, he sang praises of many important and famous people in the
society. This includes Dr. Olusola Saraki, Chief Abdulazeez Arisekola Alao; Alhaji Jimoh Saro, Chief Meredith Adisa Akinloye, Oba Lamidi Adeyemi Olayiwola III, Chief Ladoke Akintola, Ariyibi Adedibu and many others

References

Nigerian artists
Year of birth missing
1997 deaths